Slovenia competed at the 2022 World Games held in Birmingham, United States from 7 to 17 July 2022. Athletes representing Slovenia won one gold medal, one silver medal and three bronze medals. The country finished in 38th place in the medal table.

Medalists

Competitors
The following is the list of number of competitors in the Games.

Archery

Slovenia competed in archery.

Boules sports 

Slovenia competed in boules sports.

Dancesport

Slovenia competed in dancesport.

Ju-jitsu

Slovenia won two medals in ju-jitsu.

Kickboxing

Slovenia competed in kickboxing.

Rhythmic gymnastics

Slovenia won one bronze medal in rhythmic gymnastics.

Sport climbing 

Slovenia won two medals in sport climbing.

References

Nations at the 2022 World Games
2022
World Games